William Worthington Russell Jr. (December 3, 1858 – March 11, 1944) was an American diplomat who served under five presidents.

Early life
Russell was born on December 3, 1858, in Washington, D.C. He was a son of Maj. William Worthington Russell (1821–1862), once Paymaster of the Marine Corps, and Virginia ( Fletcher) Russell of Alexandria, Virginia. His two sisters were Virginia Russell (wife of John Buchanan Brewer) and Lucy Briscoe Russell.

His paternal grandparents were Robert Grier Russell (brother of U.S. Representative from Pennsylvania James McPherson Russell, both being sons of lawyer and Revolutionary War soldier Alexander Russell) and Susan Hood ( Worthington) Russell. His father was a first cousin of U.S. Representative Samuel Lyon Russell. Among his paternal uncles were Admiral Alexander Wilson Russell and Rear Admiral John Henry Russell and his first cousin was Maj.-Gen. John H. Russell Jr. (father of Brooke Astor).

He attended the Rockville Academy in Rockville, Maryland and the U.S. Naval Academy, graduating in 1881. He later studied engineering and was in the railroad business before entering the diplomatic service.

Career

Russell was connected with several surveys of railroad routes in South America, Mexico and the United States and was an assistant engineer in locating the route of the Eads ship-railway across the Isthmus of Tehuantepec. He also served as senior watch officer of the Brazilian cruiser America, which was delivered at the time of the Melo revolution in 1893.

Diplomatic career
In 1895, he was appointed secretary of the American legation at Caracas in Venezuela, serving until 1904 when he was appointed secretary of the legation and chargé d'affaires ad interim at Panama City (following its separation from Colombia in 1903). On March 17, 1904, Russell was appointed by President Theodore Roosevelt as the U.S. Envoy Extraordinary and Minister Plenipotentiary to Colombia. He presented his credentials on December 9, 1904, and served until he left his post on May 24, 1905, when "he was summoned to Washington as a witness in the investigation of the charges preferred by Herbert W. Bowen, Minister to Venezuela, against Assistant Secretary of State Loomis."

On June 21, 1905, President Roosevelt appointed him U.S. Envoy Extraordinary and Minister Plenipotentiary to Venezuela and he was commissioned during a recess of the U.S. Senate. He was recommissioned on December 11, 1905, after confirmation. Russell was recalled on March 8, 1908. Jacob Sleeper, who was serving as chargé d'Affaires ad interim, notified the Government of Venezuela that the United States had severed diplomatic relations with Venezuela on June 20, 1908. From August 1908 to January 1909, he was commissioner to the National Ecuadorian Exposition at Quito. On March 15, 1909, when diplomatic relations were re-established, Russell presented new credentials and served until he left his post on March 24, 1910.

On June 24, 1910, he was appointed by President William Howard Taft as the Minister Resident/Consul General to the Dominican Republic and presented his credentials on November 3, 1910. On September 5, 1911, he was promoted to Envoy Extraordinary and Plenipotentiary to the Dominican Republic and presented his credentials the same day. Russell left his post on March 2, 1913, and was succeeded by James Mark Sullivan until President Woodrow Wilson reappointed Russell to the post on August 16, 1915. He was commissioned during a recess of the Senate and presented his credentials on October 7, 1915, before being recommissioned on December 17, 1915, after confirmation. Russell left his post on September 12, 1925.

On September 28, 1925, he received his final diplomatic appointment from President Calvin Coolidge as U.S. Envoy Extraordinary and Minister Plenipotentiary to Siam (Thailand). He was commissioned during a recess of the Senate and recommissioned on December 17, 1925, after confirmation. He was officially received on January 9, 1926, and served until his retirement, when he left his post on January 7, 1927.

Russell was awarded the Legion of Honour by the French government in 1907 for handling French interests in Venezuela. He was also was honored by the Venezuelan government for his service to the country.

Personal life
On May 24, 1905, Russell was married to Grace Campbell Lidstone, a daughter of James M. Lidstone of London, England. Together, they were the parents of three children, William Worthington Russell III (1910–1992), Lidstone Campbell Russell (1915–1964), and Virginia A. Russell.

Russell died at 2900 Connecticut Avenue, his home in Washington, D.C. on March 11, 1944. After a funeral at St. Alban's Church, he was interred at Congressional Cemetery in Washington. His widow died in 1969.

References

External links
William Worthington Russell (1859–1944) at the U.S. Department of State
1904, Mar 25 Letter from Oscar Malmros to William Worthington Russell Theodore Roosevelt Papers.
1904, May 19 Telegram from Francis B. Loomis to William W. Russell Theodore Roosevelt Papers.
1907, Mar 10 Letter from Theodore Roosevelt to William Worthington Russell Theodore Roosevelt Papers.

1858 births
1944 deaths
United States Naval Academy alumni
20th-century American diplomats
United States Foreign Service personnel
Ambassadors of the United States to Venezuela
Ambassadors of the United States to Colombia
Ambassadors of the United States to the Dominican Republic
Ambassadors of the United States to Thailand